The 1998 Vuelta a Murcia was the 14th edition of the Vuelta a Murcia cycle race and was held on 4 March to 8 March 1998. The race started and finished in Murcia. The race was won by Alberto Elli.

General classification

References

1998
1998 in road cycling
1998 in Spanish sport